Tuotuo may refer to:

 the Ulan Moron, the headwater of the Yangtze known as the Tuotuo He in Chinese
 Todok township in Xinjiang, known as Tuotuoxiang in Chinese
 Toqto'a, the Yuan minister known as Tuotuo in Chinese